The Feneș is a right tributary of the river Feernic, in Romania. It flows into the Feernic in Cădaciu Mare.

References

Rivers of Romania
Rivers of Harghita County